Benjamin Duffield may refer to:
 Benjamin Duffield (physician)
 Benjamin Duffield (film editor)